Oral submucous fibrosis is a chronic, complex, premalignant (1% transformation risk) condition of the oral cavity, characterized by juxta-epithelial inflammatory reaction and progressive fibrosis of the submucosal tissues (the lamina propria and deeper connective tissues). As the disease progresses, the oral mucosa becomes fibrotic to the point that the person is unable to open the mouth. The condition is remotely linked to oral cancers and is associated with areca nut and / or its by-products chewing, majorly practiced in South and South-East Asian countries. The incidence of OSMF has also increased in the western countries due to the changing habits and constant migrating population.

Definitions
Per Jens J Pindborg and Satyavati Sirsat (1966) (Pathological definition)-
'An insidious chronic disease affecting any part of the oral cavity and sometimes the pharynx. Although occasionally preceded by and/or associated with vesicle formation, it is always associated with a juxta-epithelial inflammatory reaction followed by a fibro-elastic change of the lamina propria, with epithelial atrophy leading to stiffness.'

Per Mohit Sharma and Raghu Radhakrishnan (2019) - 'An insidious, chronic potentially malignant fibrotic disorder affecting the entire oral cavity and sometimes the pharynx and oesophagus. Although occasionally preceded by and/or associated with vesicle formation, it is always associated with a juxta-epithelial inflammatory reaction followed by a fibroelastic change of the lamina propria with epithelial atrophy leading to stiffness of the oral mucosa, progressive decrement in mouth opening and inability to eat'

Per Chandramani More and Naman Rao (2019) (Clinical definition)-
'A debilitating, progressive, irreversible collagen metabolic disorder induced by chronic chewing of areca nut and its commercial preparations; affecting the oral mucosa and occasionally the pharynx and esophagus; leading to mucosal stiffness and functional morbidity; and has a potential risk of malignant transformation.'

Epidemiology
The incidence of the disease is higher in people from certain parts of the world including South and South East Asian, South Africa and the Middle Eastern countries.

Symptoms
In the initial phase of the disease, the mucosa feels leathery with palpable fibrotic bands. In the advanced stage the oral mucosa loses its resiliency and becomes blanched and stiff. The disease is believed to begin in the posterior part of the oral cavity and gradually spread outward.

Other features of the disease include: 
Xerostomia
Recurrent ulceration
Pain in the ear or deafness
Nasal intonation of voice
Restriction of the movement of the soft palate
A budlike shrunken uvula
Thinning and stiffening of the lips
Pigmentation of the oral mucosa
Dryness of the mouth and burning sensation (stomatopyrosis)
Decreased mouth opening and tongue protrusion

Causes
Dried products such as paan masala and gutkha have higher concentrations of areca nut and appear to cause the disease. Other causes include:
Immunological diseases
Extreme climatic conditions
Prolonged deficiency to iron and vitamins in the diet

Pathogenesis
"Exposure to areca nut (Areca catechu) containing products with or without tobacco (ANCP/T) is currently believed to lead to OSF in individuals with genetic immunologic or nutritional predisposition to the disease."

This hypersensitivity reaction results in a juxta-epithelial inflammation that leads to increased fibroblastic activity and decreased breakdown of fibers. The fibroblasts are phenotypically modified, and the fibers they form are more stable, produce thicker bundles that progressively become less elastic. once the original loosely arranged fibrous tissue is replaced by the ongoing fibrosis, the movability of the oral tissues is reduced, there is loss of flexibility and reduced opening of the mouth.

These collagen fibers are non degradable and the phagocytic activity is minimized.

According to a  recent cross sectional study the time taken for return  of salivary pH to baseline levels after chewing areca nut containing mixtures is significantly longer in habitual users with  OSF when compared to unaffected users. Prolonged Alkaline pH induces death fetal fibroblast type and replacement by a profibrotic fibroblast. The patterns of intraoral fibrotic bands produced by alkaline chemical injury mimic those produced by areca nut chewing. Sharma et al., have equated the pathogenesis of OSF to an over-healing  wound, to explain its evolution as well as malignant transformation. Increased mechanical stiffness through YAP/TAZ pathway accelerates the malignant transformation of OSF. The atrophic epithelium in OSF has been attributed to the senescence of basal stem cell layer and the development of hyperplastic epithelium through senescence escape.

Diagnosis

Classification
Oral submucous fibrosis is clinically divided into three stages:

Stage 1: Stomatitis
Stage 2: Fibrosis
a- Early lesions, blanching of the oral mucosa
b- Older lesions, vertical and circular palpable fibrous bands in and around the mouth or lips, resulting in a mottled, marble-like appearance of the buccal mucosa
Stage 3: Sequelae of oral submucous fibrosis
a- Leukoplakia
b- Speech and hearing deficits

Khanna and Andrade in 1995 developed a group classification system for the surgical management of trismus:

Group I:  Earliest stage without mouth opening limitations with an interincisal distance of greater than 35 mm.
Group II:  Patients with an interincisal distance of 26–35 mm.
Group III:  Moderately advanced cases with an interincisal distance of 15–26 mm. Fibrotic bands are visible at the soft palate, and pterygomandibular raphe and anterior pillars of fauces are present.
Group IVA:  Trismus is severe, with an interincisal distance of less than 15 mm and extensive fibrosis of all the oral mucosa.
Group IVB:  Disease is most advanced, with premalignant and malignant changes throughout the mucosa.tumor necrosis factor alpha and keratin 17 are
interdependent regulators, they could be used as diagnostic makers and a prognostic mirror of oral
submucous fibrosis cases

Treatment
Biopsy screening although necessary is not mandatory most dentist can visually examine the area and proceed with the proper course of treatment.

Treatment includes:
Abstention from chewing areca nut (also known as betel nut) and tobacco
Minimizing consumption of spicy foods, including chiles
Maintaining proper oral hygiene
Supplementing the diet with foods rich in vitamins A, B complex, and C and iron
Forgoing hot fluids like tea, coffee
Forgoing alcohol
Employing a dental surgeon to round off sharp teeth and extract third molars
Interprofessional treatment approach 

Treatment also includes following:
The prescription of chewable pellets of hydrocortisone (Efcorlin); one pellet to be chewed every three to four hours for three to four weeks
0.5 ml intralesional injection Hyaluronidase 1500 IU mixed in 1 ml of Lignocaine into each buccal mucosa once a week for 4 weeks or more as per condition
0.5 ml intralesional injection of Hyaluronidase 1500 IU and 0.5 ml of injection Hydrocortisone acetate 25 mg/ml in each buccal mucosa once a week alternatively for 4 weeks or more as per condition
Submucosal injections of hydrocortisone 100 mg once or twice daily depending upon the severity of the disease for two to three weeks
Submucosal injections of human chorionic gonadotrophins (Placentrax) 2-3 ml per sitting twice or thrice in a week for three to four weeks
(Multiple release incisions deep to mucosa, submucosa and fibrotic tissue and suturing the gap or dehiscence so created by mucosal graft obtained from tongue and Z-plasty. In this procedure multiple deep z-shaped incisions are made into fibrotic tissue and then sutured in a straighter fashion.)
Pentoxifylline (Trental), a methylxanthine derivative that has vasodilating properties and increases mucosal vascularity, is also recommended as an adjunct therapy in the routine management of oral submucous fibrosis.
 IFN-gamma is antifibrotic cytokine which alters collagen synthesis and helps in OSF.
Colchicine tablets 0.5 mg twice a day
Lycopene, 16 mg a day helps in improvement of OSF

The treatment of patients with oral submucous fibrosis depends on the degree of clinical involvement. If the disease is detected at a very early stage, cessation of the habit is sufficient. Most patients with oral submucous fibrosis present with moderate-to-severe disease. Severe oral submucous fibrosis is irreversible. Moderate oral submucous fibrosis is reversible with cessation of habit and mouth opening exercise. Current modern day medical treatments can make the mouth opening to normal  minimum levels  of 30 mm mouth opening with proper treatment.

Research
Recently scientists have proven that intralesional injection of autologous bone marrow stem cells is a safe and effective treatment modality in oral sub mucosal fibrosis.  It has been shown autologous bone marrow stem cell injections induces angiogenesis in the area of lesion which in turn decreases the extent of fibrosis thereby leading to significant increase in mouth opening.

History
In 1952, T.Sheikh coined the term distrophica idiopathica mucosa oris to describe an oral fibrosing disease he discovered in five Indian women from Kenya. S.G. Joshi subsequently coined the termed oral submucous fibrosis (OSF) for the condition in 1953.

See also 
Cutaneous condition

References

External links 

Dermal and subcutaneous growths
Conditions of the mucous membranes
Oral mucosal pathology